Three cruising vessels of the Prussian Navy and later Imperial German Navy have been named SMS Arcona

, a frigate launched in 1858
, a steam corvette launched in 1885
, a light cruiser launched in 1902

See also
 , a passenger liner requisitioned by the Kriegsmarine during World War II

Ship names